Government Viqar-un-Nisa Women University, formerly known as Government Viqar-un-Nisa College for Women, Rawalpindi is a public women's university located in Rawalpindi, Punjab, Pakistan.

History
It was founded in the early 1950s by Begum Viqar un Nisa Noon, wife of Feroz Khan Noon. Begum Viqar-un-Nisa Noon also founded the Viqar-un-Nisa Noon Girls' Higher Secondary School in Rawalpindi. This college was the first established part of the school, but it has since then been taken over by the government. Today, the college remains a government institution while the school is still private.

In 2012, the Science Block was named after Arfa Karim.

In July 2021, this college for women was upgraded to a university. In the years after 2010 more degrees began to be awarded in collaboration with Sheffield Hallam University.

Programs
Urdu and English are taught at the postgraduate level.
Chemistry
Physics
Zoology
Applied Psychology
Islamic Studies

Faculty
 Azra Quraishi

References

Women's universities and colleges in Pakistan
Universities and colleges in Rawalpindi District
Public universities and colleges in Punjab, Pakistan